Carl Thomas Brewer (October 21, 1938 – August 25, 2001) was a Canadian professional ice hockey defenceman. Brewer attended De La Salle College and Riverdale Collegiate Institute prior to his hockey career.

Brewer started his career with the Toronto Maple Leafs in 1958. He also played with the Detroit Red Wings and St. Louis Blues. He won three Stanley Cups with Toronto in 1962, 1963 and 1964. He regained his amateur status after walking out of Maple Leafs training camp in 1965. He was not eligible to become a professional again until December 18, 1968. In 1966 and 1967 he played with the Canadian National team, winning a bronze medal at the 1967 Ice Hockey World Championships. His contractual rights were traded from the Maple Leafs to the Red Wings for Doug Barrie on March 4, 1968. He was a player-coach with the Muskegon Mohawks at the time of the transaction. His brief stint in HIFK made such an impact on Finnish hockey that he was inducted to the Finnish Hockey Hall of Fame in 2003.

In the 1990s, Brewer played a major role in seeing former NHL Players' Association boss Alan Eagleson convicted and sent to prison for racketeering, fraud and embezzling.

Brewer died on August 25, 2001, following heart problems.

Awards and achievements
Named to the NHL Second All-Star Team in 1962, 1965 and 1970
Named to the NHL First All-Star Team in 1963
Won the Stanley Cup in 1962, 1963, and 1964
Was inducted into the Finnish Hockey Hall of Fame in 2003
Was inducted into Canada's Sports Hall Of Fame 2002

Personal life

Carl spent 17 years investigating National Hockey League pensions and the activities of R. Alan Eagleson, then executive director of the National Hockey League Player's Association. His determination and efforts alongside longtime companion Susan Foster resulted in Eagleson's incarceration and the NHL players receiving their entitled diverted pension funds totalling more than $50 million dollars.
Carl's son Mike also played professional hockey and was an All-American at Brown in 1992.

Career statistics

Regular season and playoffs

References

External links

1938 births
2001 deaths
Canadian expatriate ice hockey players in Finland
Canadian ice hockey defencemen
Detroit Red Wings players
HIFK (ice hockey) players
Ice hockey people from Toronto
Muskegon Mohawks players
National Hockey League All-Stars
New Brunswick Hawks players
Rochester Americans players
St. Louis Blues players
Stanley Cup champions
Toronto Maple Leafs players
Toronto Marlboros players
Toronto Toros players